Richard Crockett Edgley (born February 6, 1936) has been a general authority of the Church of Jesus Christ of Latter-day Saints (LDS Church) since October 1992. He was the first counselor in the church's presiding bishopric from 1995 to 2012 and was the second counselor from 1992 to 1995. He was designated as an emeritus general authority in March 2012.

Born in Preston, Idaho he obtained a bachelor's degree in political science from Brigham Young University and a master's degree in business administration from Indiana University. Edgley was a vice president of General Mills and became affectionately known as the "company Mormon" while working there as an executive.

LDS Church service
As a young man, Edgley served as a missionary in the eastern United States and later served in the church as a stake president and bishop. Prior to his call as a general authority, he was the managing director of the church's Finance and Records Department. Edgley was called as second counselor to Presiding Bishop Robert D. Hales in 1992. In 1994, Merrill J. Bateman replaced Hales and Edgley was retained as second counselor. When former first counselor, H. David Burton, became presiding bishop in 1995, Edgley was called as first counselor. Edgley also participated in unveiling the first solar powered meetinghouse of the LDS Church in North America and a prototype eco-friendly meeting house.

Personal life
Edgley is married to Pauline Nielson and they are the parents of six children.

References

External links
Richard C. Edgley Official profile

1936 births
American general authorities (LDS Church)
American Mormon missionaries in the United States
Brigham Young University alumni
Indiana University alumni
Living people
Counselors in the Presiding Bishopric (LDS Church)
20th-century Mormon missionaries
Religious leaders from Idaho
Latter Day Saints from Idaho